Exhibit Columbus is a program of Landmark Columbus Foundation and an exploration of community, architecture, art, and design that activates the modern legacy of Columbus, Indiana. It creates a cycle of programming that uses this context to convene conversations around innovative ideas and to commission site-responsive installations in a free, public exhibition. It features the internationally sought after J. Irwin and Xenia S. Miller Prize.

The award-winning and critically acclaimed project has been credited with renewing the design legacy of Columbus, Indiana. After hosting its inaugural symposium, "Foundations and Futures," in the fall of 2016 and inaugural exhibition in the fall of 2017, symposia have occurred in 2018 and 2020 and exhibitions in 2019 and 2021. Exhibit Columbus has four key components: The Miller Prize, High School Design Team, University Design Research Fellowships, and Environmental design and Wayfinding.

The J. Irwin and Xenia S. Miller Prize 
The Miller Prize was created to honor J. Irwin Miller and his wife Xenia S. Miller, two of the twentieth century's most significant patrons of architecture and design, and a "family whose visionary commitment to community remains unparalleled." The J. Irwin and Xenia S. Miller Prize is the centerpiece of both Exhibit Columbus's symposium and exhibition; recipients are international leaders selected for their commitment to the transformative power that architecture, art, and design has to improve people's lives and make cities better places to live. With this award, Exhibit Columbus brings studios’ unique perspectives to Columbus to explore the traditions and values that have created this city's internationally renowned design legacy. Each studio is paired with a significant downtown site to create new forms that encourage a rediscovery of the site's purpose, while further connecting people to place and community.

In 2016 ten designers were paired at one of the five sites in a competition to see which team would be selected by a jury for the opportunity to build an installation in conversation with the past while exploring the future of design and fabrication.

In 2018 five studios were selected as Miller Prize winners from a short list. These studios were selected for their commitment to using art and architecture to improve people's lives and make cities better places to live. After the 2019 Design Presentations in January 2019, Wallpaper* declared that the exhibition "promises to celebrate women in architecture," and The Republic Newspaper indicated that the installations would lean heavily on landscape architecture.

2019 Exhibition
The 2019 exhibition participants were announced in the summer of 2018, and participated as speakers in the 2018 National Symposium: Design, Community, and Progressive Preservation. The exhibition opened on August 24 and ran through December 1, 2019.

The exhibition featured 18 site-responsive installations by architects, designers, academics, artists, and graphic designers. These designers created outdoor installations and experiences that used Columbus’ built heritage as inspiration and context, while highlighting the role that visionary community plays in growing a vibrant, sustainable, and equitable city.

For inspiration, Exhibit Columbus looked to the 1986 exhibition, Good Design and the Community: Columbus, Indiana, created when Columbus business leader and philanthropist J. Irwin Miller became the first person inducted into the National Building Museum Hall of Fame in Washington. Mr. Miller chose to emphasize the community's process and involvement in building, rather than the architecture itself, as a source of his hometown pride.

Elaborating on the connection between the tangible and intangible culture that Mr. Miller described, the 2019 exhibition explored the idea of “good design in the community,” and what it means today.

2019 Miller Prize Recipients
The 2019 exhibition featured five J. Irwin and Xenia S. Miller Prize recipients:

 Agency Landscape + Planning (Cambridge, MA)
Site: AT&T Facility, 1978, Paul Kennon of Caudill Rowlett Scott
 Bryony Roberts Studio (New York, NY)
Site: Columbus City Hall, 1981, Edward Charles Bassett, Skidmore, Owings, and Merrill
 Frida Escobedo Studio (Mexico City, Mexico)
Site: Cleo Rogers Memorial Library Plaza, 1971, I.M. Pei and Partners
 MASS Design Group (Boston, MA; Kigali, Rwanda)
Site: Central Middle School, 2007, Ralph Johnson of Perkins + Will
 SO-IL (New York, NY)
Site: Bartholomew County Courthouse Lawn, 1871-74, Isaac Hodgson

Washington Street Civic Projects

 Borderless Studio (Chicago)
 Extrapolation Factory (New York)
 LA Más (Los Angeles)
 People for Urban Progress (Indianapolis) 
 PienZa Sostenible (Mexico City)

University Design Research Fellows
These fellowships were created to showcase current research by leading professors of architecture and design and highlight innovative research that explores ways that architecture and design can improve people's lives and make cities stronger.

 Viola Ago and Hans Tursack (Ohio State University and Massachusetts Institute of Technology)
 Sean Ahlquist (University of Michigan)
 Christopher Battaglia (Ball State University)
 Sean Lally and Matthew Wizinsky (University of Illinois at Chicago and University of Cincinnati)
 Daniel Luis Martinez and Etien Santiago (Indiana University)
 Marshall Prado (University of Tennessee)

High School Design Team
Columbus’ architectural legacy and its impact on the community started with investments made in the schools. The commissioning of innovative, well-designed educational facilities helped create what can be seen today: a quality, forward-thinking educational system. Inspired by J. Irwin Miller's vision, Exhibit Columbus seeks to connect the next generation of the Columbus community to its design heritage through the High School Design Team.

Environmental design and wayfinding 
Thirst is designing a system that provides a cohesive experience that connects each installation.

The Environmental Design and Wayfinding of the 2019 Exhibition unified the many facets of the exhibition through a system of color-coded installation kiosks and an exhibition guide design by Thirst, with complimentary guides in the form of a Family Activity Guide designed by Rosten Woo, and the Hear/Here app created by Halsey Burgund. Exhibit Columbus considers Environmental Design and Wayfinding as the 18th installation as it forms a continuous language that serves to inspire, educate, and connect to Exhibit Columbus’ purpose and the exhibition theme.

Publications, mobile app, and videos
Exhibit Columbus sought to provide an enjoyable and meaningful experience for all ages. The Family Activity Guide, designed by Rosten Woo, invited children and families to learn about and interact with the exhibition, as well as interpret Columbus’ design heritage.

Hear/Here is an interactive location-based audio app that offers an aural exploration of the exhibition and invites visitors to upload their own voices. Historic audio clips, insights from community members, and interviews with exhibition participants come together in the Hear/Here app––creating a new way to interact with the exhibition and experience the city's design legacy.

2018 symposium
The 2018 symposium took place September 26 to September 29, and was created in partnership with Docomomo US, American Institute of Architects Indiana and Kentucky, and the Indianapolis Museum of Art at Newfields. The theme for the symposium was Design, Community, and Progressive Preservation, a title which recognizes the need to look for forward looking preservation plans in the future of cities.  The Architect's Newspaper proclaimed that the symposium was "unburdened by the lack of old-school historic preservation and architectural history thought chains, and discussion instead focused on innovation, creativity, and participation over historical facts delivered by academics." Over four days about 1200 attendees  experienced sessions in many of the historic buildings throughout Columbus. The symposium culminated with introductory remarks from the 2019 Miller Prize Winners.

2017 exhibition
The 2017 exhibition opened on 26 August and features 18 site-responsive installations in downtown Columbus. Funding from the project has come from a number of individuals, corporations, and foundations in the region, including the Ball State University, Cummins, Indiana University, Efroymson Family Fund, and the Graham Foundation for Advanced Studies in the Fine Arts. The eighteen installations on view during the inaugural exhibition were:

Miller Prize Installations
Five projects of architecture or art that are in conversation with one of the Miller Prize Sites; 
Another Circle by Aranda\Lasch at Mill Race Park
Anything can happen in the woods by Plan B at the Cummins Office Building
The Exchange by Oyler Wu at the Irwin Conference Center
Wiikiaami by studio:indigenous at First Christian Church
Conversation Plinth by IKD at Cleo Rogers Memorial Library

2016 Miller Prize Finalists
 Benjamin Aranda and Chris Lasch of Aranda\Lasch (Tucson, AZ and New York, NY)
 Benjamin Ball and Gaston Nogues of Ball-Nogues Studio (Los Angeles, CA)
 Herwig Baumgartner and Scott Uriu of Baumgartner + Uriu (Los Angeles, CA)
 Rachel Hayes of Rachel B. Hayes Studio (Tulsa, OK)
 Eric Höweler and Meejin Yoon of Höweler+Yoon (Boston, MA)
 Yugon Kim and Tomomi Itakura of IKD (Boston, MA)
 Sharon Johnston and Mark Lee of Johnston Marklee and Jonathan Olivares (Los Angeles, CA)
 Dwayne Oyler and Jenny Wu of Oyler Wu Collaborative (Los Angeles, CA)
 Joyce Hsiang and Bimal Mendis of Plan B Architecture & Urbanism (New Haven, CT)
 Chris Cornelius of studio:indigenous (Milwaukee, WI)

2016-17 Miller Prize sites
 First Christian Church (1942) by Saarinen and Saarinen
 Irwin Conference Center (1954) by Eero Saarinen and Associates
 Cleo Rogers Memorial Library (1969) by I.M. Pei and Partners
 Cummins Corporate Office Building (1984) by Kevin Roche John Dinkeloo Associates
 Mill Race Park (1992) by Michael Van Valkenburgh Associates with architecture by Stanley Saitowitz.

2016 Miller Prize Juried Presentations

On 10 December the 10 Miller Prize finalists presented their concepts to a jury that will decide the winners. The presentations took place at Columbus City Hall. The jury for the competition consisted of:
 Sean Anderson, Museum of Modern Art
 Lise Anne Couture, Asymptote Architecture
 Jennifer Dunlop Fletcher, San Francisco Museum of Modern Art
 Dung Ngo, August Editions
 Jason Hatton, Bartholomew County Public Library
 Mark Jones, Columbus Parks and Recreation
 Brad Manns, Cummins Inc.
 Larry Ruble, First Christian Church

Washington Street Installations 
Five installations by designers selected by leading design galleries;
Columbus Circles by Productora
Pause by Pettersen & Hein
Theoretical Foyer by Cody Hoyt
Playhouse by Snarkitecture
Window to Columbus by Formafantasma

University Installations 
Five installations created by architecture schools: 
 Ball State University R. Wayne Estopinal College of Architecture and Planning
 The Ohio State University Austin E. Knowlton School of Architecture
 University of Cincinnati School of Architecture and Interior Design
 University of Kentucky School of Architecture
 University of Michigan Taubman College of Architecture and Urban Planning
 Plus an installation created by students in the Indiana University School of Art and Design;

High School Installation
Between the Threads by high school students from Columbus schools.

Image and Environmental Design
Street banners, way finding, and publications by Thirst, a Chicago-based graphic design company.

Iterations of installations
Many of the temporary installations from the exhibition have gone on to be exhibited in other exhibitions or at new sites.
 Alchemy was exhibited as part of the 2018 Venice Biennale of Architecture.
Playhouse was exhibited as part of a retrospective for Snarkitecture at the National Building Museum in the summer of 2018. 
Theoretical Foyer by Cody Hoyt was given to the City of Columbus by Patrick Parish Gallery.

2016 symposium

The 2016 symposium took place September 29 to October 1 and was entitled "Foundations and Futures." It featured a sold out keynote session with  Deborah Berke, Will Miller, Robert A. M. Stern, and Michael Van Valkenburgh and sessions with experts on the history of Modern architecture, Columbus, Indiana, fabrication, and the community.

The symposium was billed as the first step to launch the first exhibition which is slated to take place in August 2017.  All ten of the 2016 Miller Prize Finalists were featured in panel discussions. The 2016 symposium was recognized by NUVO as a "2016 Best Of Editors Pick."

Project development
Early planning work for Exhibit Columbus began in late 2014, and the project was officially launched on 5 May 2016 in Columbus as a program of Heritage Fund—The Community Foundation of Bartholomew County. It receives funding from a number of local and regional individuals, foundations, and corporations.

100 Variations
An exhibition was developed in the fall of 2014 as a pilot project that featured designer Jonathan Nesci who created 100 unique tables for an installation in front of First Christian Church.  This exhibition, "100 Variations," was produced by Indianapolis-based curator, Christopher West with support from the Haddad Foundation, the Columbus Area Visitors Center, and the Columbus Museum of Art and Design.  Each of the tables was made by Noblitt Fabricating in Columbus, Indiana under the leadership of Curt Aton.

Graphic identity
The Chicago-based graphic design firm, Thirst, was hired in 2016 to create the Exhibit Columbus identity with the goal of creating a system that was aligned with Paul Rand's designs in Columbus, along with Alexander Girard's work at the Miller House and Garden.  This identity was immediately recognized with an award from the Society of Typographic Artists, and has gone on to considerable critical acclaim.  The identity was primarily created by Rick Valicenti, a 2006 AIGA medalist and a 2009 National Design Award winner.

See also 
 ArtPrize
 Chicago Architecture Biennial
 Design Indaba
 List of architecture prizes
 Prospect New Orleans
 Venice Biennale of Architecture

References

External links 

 

Architecture festivals
Cultural conferences
Arts awards in the United States
Awards established in 2016
Festivals established in 2016
Festivals in Indiana
Art biennials
Tourist attractions in Indiana
Culture of Columbus, Indiana
American architecture awards
Design awards
2016 establishments in Indiana
Design events
Art and design organizations
Architectural design
Architectural competitions